The Seneca Historic District is a national historic district located at Poolesville, Montgomery County, Maryland.  The district comprises  of federal, state, and county parkland and farmland in which 15 historic buildings are situated. The Chesapeake and Ohio Canal, including Seneca Aqueduct (Aqueduct No. 1), Lock No. 24 (Riley's Lock), the adjacent lock house; as well as the Seneca Quarry and quarry masters house above the quarry also stand within the district and are also within Seneca Creek State Park.  The 15 historic structures are surrounded by dependencies of various periods, in most cases dating from the period of the dwelling. There are slave quarters, smokehouses, springhouses, corn cribs, and tobacco barns.

It was listed on the National Register of Historic Places in 1978.

References

External links

, including photo in 2003, at Maryland Historical Trust website
Boundary Map of the Seneca Historic District, Montgomery County, at Maryland Historical Trust

Historic districts on the National Register of Historic Places in Maryland
1800s architecture in the United States
Historic districts in Montgomery County, Maryland
National Register of Historic Places in Montgomery County, Maryland
Slave cabins and quarters in the United States